Anthrenocerus schwarzeneggeri is a species of beetles, native to Australia.  It is within the genus Anthrenocerus and the family Dermestidae.  It is native to New South Wales It is named after Arnold Schwarzenegger.

References

Dermestidae